Artur Stanisław Potocki (1787–1832) was a Polish nobleman (szlachcic).

Biography
He was the son of Julia Lubomirska and Jan Potocki, the travel writer best known for his novel Manuscript found in Saragossa. Artur was the owner of Krzeszowice and Łańcut estates. He became officer in the Polish Army and aide-de-camp of Prince Józef Poniatowski. He was married to Zofia Branicka, since 1816.

He died on 30 January in Vienna and was buried on 27 May 1832 in the Potocki Chapel in the Wawel Cathedral, Kraków.

Awards
 Virtuti Militari
 Légion d'honneur

Sources
 Wawrzyniec Siek (Ed.), Opis historyczny parafii i miasta Staszów do 1918 r., Staszów, 1990 Parafia Rzymsko-Katolicka
 Aldona Cholewianka-Kruszyńska: Wychowanie dzieci – braci Alfreda i Artura Potockich w Łańcucie...

External links

1787 births
1832 deaths
Polish Army officers
Recipients of the Virtuti Militari
Recipients of the Legion of Honour
Artur